Northern Skirts is a 1999 German-language film directed by Barbara Albert. It was an international co-production between Austria, Germany, and Switzerland. It was Austria's official Best Foreign Language Film submission at the 72nd Academy Awards, but did not manage to receive a nomination. The film addresses the marginalisation of the Vienna's migrant and ethnic minority population against the background of rising xenophobia encouraged by Joerg Haider and the so-called Freedom Party.

Cast
Nina Proll as Jasmin Schmid
Edita Malovcic as Tamara
Astrit Alihajdaraj as Senad
Tudor Chirilă as Valentin
Michael Tanczos as Roman
Georg Friedrich as Wolfgang
Martina Stojan as Sonja
Marta Klubowicz as Jolanta
Brigitte Kren as Gitti

Reception
David Rooney of Variety wrote "Northern Skirts remains too fragmented in its presentation of characters and plot to bring its themes of family and emotional connection fully into focus".

See also
List of submissions to the 72nd Academy Awards for Best Foreign Language Film
List of Austrian submissions for the Academy Award for Best Foreign Language Film

References

External links

German drama films
Austrian drama films
Swiss drama films
Romanian-language films
Serbo-Croatian-language films
1990s German-language films
1990s German films